Circapina is a genus of moths belonging to the family Tortricidae.

Species
Circapina flexalana Brown, 2003

See also
List of Tortricidae genera

References

 , 2003, Proceedings of the Entomological Society of Washington 105 (3): 630–640. 
 , 2005, World Catalogue of Insects 5

External links
tortricidae.com

Euliini
Tortricidae genera